Reuss was the name of several historical states located in present-day Thuringia, Germany. Several lordships of the Holy Roman Empire which arose after 1300 and became Imperial Counties from 1673 and Imperial Principalities in the late 18th century were ruled by the House of Reuss.

A varying number of these counties came into being by partition; they were partially merged and divided again. After the end of the empire in 1806, the principality of the elder line, as well as several of the younger, became sovereign member states of the German Confederation, with the younger ones merging into a unified principality by 1848. The two remaining territories became federal principalities of the German Empire in 1871, the Principality of Reuss Elder Line with the state capital of Greiz and the Principality of Reuss Younger Line with the state capital of Gera. Both states were ruled by the House of Reuss until the German Revolution of 1918–1919. The head of each branch bore the German title Fürst (Prince, as head of a princely house) while their children and all other members of the house bore the title Prinz/Prinzessin (Prince/Princess, as agnate members of a princely house).

Since the end of the 12th century, all male members of the House of Reuss are named Heinrich, in honour of Henry VI, Holy Roman Emperor (1190–1197), to whom they owed the dominions of Weida and Gera. For the purpose of differentiation, they are given order numbers according to certain systems (see below, section Numbering of the Heinrichs), and in private life they are distinguished by nicknames.

History of the various states
Several different principalities of the House of Reuss which had previously existed had by the time of the formation of the German Confederation become part of the two remaining lines (the Elder and the Younger lines).  Before then, they had been part first of the Holy Roman Empire, and then the Confederation of the Rhine.

Origins
The region including what would become the Principality of Reuss was inhabited in early medieval times by Slavic people who were converted to Christianity by the German Emperor Otto I (936–973). In church matters the region was under the Diocese of Zeitz (founded in 968), which became a suffragan of Magdeburg. On account of the frequent inroads of the Slavs, the residence of the Bishop of Zeitz was removed to Naumburg in 1028, after which the See was called Naumburg-Zeitz.

Upon its subjection to German authority, the whole province was allotted to the March of Zeitz. As early as the year 1000, however, Emperor Otto III permitted the entire part lying on the eastern boundary of Thuringia, a wooded area, sparsely populated by the West Slavic people of the Sorbs, to be cleared for farmland and settled by German settlers. Emperor Henry IV appointed Henry the Pious of Gleissberg (c. 1040−1120) imperial vogt, or bailiff (advocatus imperii) of this settlement area, under the rule of the imperial Quedlinburg Abbey. He was a son of Erkenbert I of Weida, the oldest known ancestor of the family, who is mentioned in 1122 in the entourage of Count Adalbert of Everstein at the consecration of St John's church in Plauen. The name of the area Heinrich controlled derives from his office: Vogtland (Terra advocatorum, Land of the Bailiff). This designation has remained to this day a geographical summary for a region of 3,467 km2 (comparable roughly to the county of Essex) which is located in Saxony, Thuringia and, to a lesser extent, in northern Bavaria.

The House of the Vogts (Bailiffs) 

The position of vogt soon became hereditary. While the dominions of Heinrich von Gleissberg included the towns Gera and Weida, his grandson Henry II the Rich (d. before 1209) also acquired Plauen. When his three sons divided their inheritance, three independent areas emerged, ruled by the branches of the bailiffs of Weida-Ronneburg, Plauen-Gera and Greiz-Reichenbach. The bailiffs, initially unfree nobles (Ministerialis), quickly rose to the rank of lords. After the division, the official title Vogt was carried on by all branches and passed on like a hereditary imperial fiefdom. When the bailiffs negotiated a treaty with Henry III, Margrave of Meissen in 1254, they acted as equal partners. In 1329 Emperor Ludwig the Bavarian confirmed the bailiffs a rank equal to Princes of the Holy Roman Empire, albeit without the title itself, they continued to use the designation Vogt.

In the 12th and 13th centuries, the bailiffs of Weida gradually became independent of the Quedlinburg Abbey on the lands they administered. Their area included what is generally understood today as Vogtland. Over time the dominions of the bailiffs extended beyond the Vogtland into the Western Ore Mountains, with areas extending into what is now the Czech Republic.

The Weida branch was extinct in 1535, the branch of Greiz-Reichenbach was soon inherited by the branch of Plauen-Gera which then divided into Plauen (elder and younger line) and Gera-Schleiz-Lobenstein (extinct in 1550). The elder Plauen line of the vogts was extinct in 1380, the founder of the younger Plauen line was Henry (d. about 1300), who on account of his stay in Eastern European regions and his marriage with a granddaughter of King Daniel of Galicia received the surname of "der Reusse" (Ruthenus, a term for the Kievan Rus'), whence the name later passed to his country. His descendants were styled Lords Reuss of Plauen, Greiz and Gera. The House of Reuss is thus descended from the vogts of Plauen from whom they inherited the cities and lordships of Gera, Greiz, Schleiz and Lobenstein. However, in the fourteenth and fifteenth centuries the vogts had lost the greater part of their possessions, most of which fell to the Electorate of Saxony, including Weida in 1427 and Plauen in 1482.

House of Reuss

In 1306 the Plauen branch of the vogts was subdivided into an elder line (at Plauen) that died out around 1380, and a younger line (at Greiz and Reichenbach), called Reuss. In 1564 the latter was subdivided into three branches, the Elder (extinct in 1927), the Middle (extinct in 1616), and the Younger (of which the ruling line became extinct in 1945) and a side line, split off in 1692, Reuss-Köstritz, which had been raised to (however non-ruling) princes in 1806, still exists with about 30 male relatives, all named Heinrich, as the last surviving branch of the family, with the senior of this branch, the Prince Reuss-Köstritz, as head of the entire house, hence now The Fürst Reuss, while the others hold the agnatic title of prince.

In 1673 the Lords Reuss were raised to  Imperial Counts and (depending on the line) from 1778 (1790 or 1802) to Imperial Princes. The dynasty ruled divided areas in various lines and sub-lines; around 1700 there were ten Reussian counties of both main branches. The lords, counts and princes were never styled of Reuss, but rather count or prince Reuss, as Reuss was originally not the name of a town or castle, but rather a personal designation for the founder of the branch that indicated his foreign connection through marriage (Reussen is in fact an older German term for Russians), and the family is still referred to today in the plural as die Reussen.

On account of the close relations of Reuss with the neighbouring Saxon states, Lutheranism speedily gained a foothold in Reuss. The rulers joined the Schmalkaldic League against the German emperor, and forfeited their possessions, but afterwards recovered them.

Numbering of the Heinrichs

All the males of the House of Reuss are named Heinrich (Henry) plus a number. In the elder line the numbering covers all male children of the elder House, and the numbers increase until 100 is reached and then start again at 1. In the younger line the system is similar but the numbers increase until the end of the century before starting again at 1. This odd regulation was formulated as a Family Law in 1688, but the tradition of the uniformity of name was in practice as early as 1200.  It was seen as a way of honoring the Hohenstaufen Emperor Heinrich/Henry VI, who raised Heinrich der Reiche/Henry the Rich (+1209) to the office of provost of the Quedlinburg Abbey, thus taking on the title of vogt.

Main partition

In 1564 the sons of Henry XIII of Reuss at Greiz divided the estates into
Reuss at Lower Greiz, descendants of Henry XIV the Elder
Reuss at Upper Greiz, descendants of Henry XV the Middle
Reuss at Gera, descendants of Henry XVI the Younger.
While the Middle Reuss became extinct in 1616, the Older and Younger lines were divided again several times until in 1778 Count Henry XI united the possessions of Upper and Lower Greiz to the Principality of Reuss Elder Line. In return the remaining estates of Gera, considerably larger though, became the Principality of Reuss Younger Line in 1806. The two remaining Reuss principalities joined the German Confederation in 1815. Several subdivisions of the Younger Line merged into a unified state by 1848.

Henry XXII of Reuss Elder line is notable among the modern princes of this house for his enmity to Prussia, which he opposed in the Austro-Prussian War of 1866, when the Prussian troops occupied his domain. Henry joined the North German Confederation and the new German Empire in 1871. He alone of all the confederate princes remained until his death in 1902 an implacable enemy of Prince Bismarck and of the conditions created in Germany by the foundation of the empire. Despite his views, his daughter Hermine Reuss of Greiz later became the second wife of the exiled German Emperor Wilhelm II. Other daughters of the house also made important marriages: Countess Augusta Reuss of Ebersdorf, by marriage the Duchess of Saxe-Coburg-Saalfeld, was the maternal grandmother of Queen Victoria and the paternal grandmother of Albert, Prince Consort. Princess Augusta Reuss of Köstritz married the Grand Duke of Mecklenburg-Schwerin in 1849 and Eleonore Reuss of Köstritz became queen consort of Bulgaria in 1908.

Heinrich XXIV, Prince Reuss of Greiz (1878–1927), was incapable of ruling and therefore the regency passed to the ruling prince of the younger line of Reuss. Since the childless Heinrich XXIV was the last of his line, it was to be expected that the principality of the elder line would fall to the younger line after his death, and that a united state of Reuss would emerge as a result. However, both lines lost their thrones in the German Revolution of 1918–19 and a united, albeit republican state, the People's State of Reuss, emerged in 1919, only to merge with the larger state of Thuringia in 1920. The unified state of Reuss had a non-contiguous area of 1,143 square kilometers and 211,324 inhabitants (1919).

A (non-governing) side branch of the younger line had emerged in 1692 when Heinrich XXIV, Count Reuss of Köstritz, a younger son of the ruling count Heinrich I. Reuss of Schleiz, received a number of landed estates as a paréage within his eldest brother's county, with his main seat at Köstritz Castle. This branch connected through marriages with important ruling houses, did however not govern their own territory, but lived as landowners in the county of the Schleiz Line. Henry XLIII., count Reuss of Köstritz, was elevated to hereditary Fürst (prince) by Emperor Francis II in 1806 (however without governmental power); the paréage of Köstritz remained within the principality of the younger line.

When the elder line died out with Heinrich XXIV in 1927 and the younger one when Heinrich XLV, son of the last ruler, died childless in 1945 as a prisoner of the communists, thus both main branches having become extinct, the dynastic succession (and the theoretical claims to their thrones) passed to the princely House Reuss of Köstritz. This side line of the Younger Line is therefore the only branch of the entire house that still exists today, but has over 30 male members, all named Heinrich. The family council decided on June 5, 1930, that all members of the remaining family should henceforth omit any line addition (Younger Line or Köstritz) from their names and call themselves Prince or Princess Reuss. This name (as well as the Heinrichs' count) was retained by a court order even in the Weimar republic. The current head of the family, Heinrich XIV, dynastic actually the Fürst (Prince) Reuss of Köstritz (b. 1952), is also styled The Fürst (Prince) Reuss, as Köstritz is no longer a side line but the only branch of the house.  His main seat is Ernstbrunn Castle in Austria which his family had inherited in 1822, while Köstritz Castle was expropriated by communist East Germany in 1945 and demolished in the 1970s. In 1945, the Princes Reuss lost all of their extended possessions and castles in their ancestral homeland through expropriation. Heinrich XIV and some of his relatives regained some properties in the former Reuss states following German Reunification in 1990.

Aftermath
After World War I, the Reuss territories were unified in 1919 as the People's State of Reuss, which was incorporated into the new state of Thuringia in 1920.

Rulers of Reuss

House of Reuss

Partitions of Reuss under Reuss rule

Table of rulers

Side branch member's links to Reichsbürger movement 
On 7 December 2022, German police conducted an operation which resulted in the arrest of 25 alleged members of the far-right group Reichsbürger, including a member of the Köstritz branch of the House of Reuss, identified as Heinrich XIII Prince Reuss. The suspects arrested in the operation were allegedly planning to overturn the existing German government, and instate Heinrich XIII as the new German de facto leader. His distant cousin Heinrich XIV Prince Reuss, the head and speaker of the House of Reuss and its family association, had previously referred to Heinrich XIII as "a confused old man who had been radicalised through disappointments". On behalf of the family association, which Heinrich XIII had left years ago, Heinrich XIV sharply distanced himself from him again after he was arrested, saying that "30 years ago he was a modern businessman, but nowadays he is fooled by all sorts of conspiracy theories". In the line of succession to the House of Reuss, Heinrich XIII only ranked 17th, and the head of the house called him "a marginal figure". He said his behaviour was a "catastrophe" for the family, whose heritage as tolerant and cosmopolitan rulers was now associated with "terrorists and reactionaries". He believes Reuss' anti-government views derive from his resentment at the German judicial system for its failure to recognize his claims to family properties expropriated at the end of World War II.

In fiction
A young Reuss count, sent to the 1815 Congress of Vienna, is the protagonist of the 1899 operetta Wiener Blut and the 1942 film based on it.  Much of the hilarity of the film centers around his impossible name of "Reuss-Schleiz-Greiz".

See also 
 Burgraves of Meissen

References

Sources
 Thomas Gehrlein: Das Haus Reuß (The House of Reuss), volumes I-IV. Publisher: Börde-Verlag, Werl 2015, ISBN 978-3-9815864-6-6 or ISBN 978-3-9815864-7-3.
 Friedrich Majer: Chronik des Fürstlichen Hauses der Reussen von Plauen. (Chronicle of the Princely House Reuss of Plauen), Weimar and Leipzig 1811 (online version).
 Sigismund Stucke: Die Reußen und ihr Land. Die Geschichte einer süddeutschen Dynastie. (The Reuss and their country. The history of a southern German dynasty), St. Michael 1984, ISBN 3-7053-1954-X. reissue: publisher Arnshaugk Verlag, Neustadt 2022, ISBN 978-3-95930-252-4.
 Almanach de Gotha:
 Gothaischer Hofkalender 1781, Gotha 1780 (first publication).
 Gothaischer Hofkalender zum Nutzen und Vergnügen auf das Jahr 1792, C. W. Ettinger, Gotha 1791. online version
 Gothaischer Hofkalender 1877, Gotha 1876. online version 
 Gothaischer Hofkalender 1894, Gotha 1893. online version
 Gothaisches Genealogisches Handbuch, Fürstliche Häuser (Gotha Genealogical Handbook −german article−, Princely Houses), 2015, 1. Abteilung (first department), vol 1 of the complete series of the GGH books, publisher: Verlag des Deutschen Adelsarchivs (Publisher of the German Nobility Archive), Marburg 2015, pp. 227–247; 628–634. ISBN 978-3-9817243-0-1.

External links

 
 Héraldique européenne (in French)
 Family tree in German Wikipedia: Stammliste des Hauses Reuß

States of the Confederation of the Rhine
Counties of the Holy Roman Empire
Upper Saxon Circle
 
States and territories established in the 1010s
States and territories disestablished in 1778
States and territories disestablished in 1806
1010s establishments in the Holy Roman Empire
1778 disestablishments in the Holy Roman Empire
1806 disestablishments in the Holy Roman Empire
 
Henry VI, Holy Roman Emperor